Hely is both a given name and a surname, and may refer to:

Given name
 Hely Ollarves (born 1981), Venezuelan athlete
 Hely Yánes (born 1967), Venezuelan boxer

Surname
 Cuthbert Hely, English lutenist and composer
 Frederick Augustus Hely (1794–1836), Australian public servant
 Hovenden Hely (1823–1872), Australian explorer and politician
 Sir John Hely (died 1701), English-born Irish judge
 Peter Hely (1944–2005), Australian judge
 Steve Hely, American writer
 William Hely (1909–1970), Royal Australian Air Force officer

See also
 Healy (disambiguation)
 Hely-Hutchinson